Ion Dichiseanu (20 October 1933 – 20 May 2021) was a Romanian actor. He was known, among other things, for playing in Kampf um Rom, Titanic Waltz and Mofturi 1900. Dichiseanu died in the Floreasca Hospital in Bucharest on 20 May 2021, aged 87, after having stayed months hospitalized there. The cause of his death was a bacterial infection that caused a pneumonia.

References

20th-century Romanian actors
Romanian male film actors
Romanian male stage actors
Romanian radio actors
Romanian male television actors
Romanian male voice actors
1933 births
2021 deaths
People from Adjud
Caragiale National University of Theatre and Film alumni
Deaths from pneumonia in Romania
Burials at Bellu Cemetery